Aleutians East Borough School District (AEBSD) is a school district headquartered in Sand Point, Alaska.

Several smaller school districts consolidated into the AEBSD, which opened in 1988. Most of the schools were previously in the Aleutian Region School District, and that of King Cove was in its own school district.

 the district operated four schools serving a total of 250 students.

Schools
 Akutan School
 False Pass School
 King Cove School
 Sand Point School

Previously the district operated the Cold Bay School and the Nelson Lagoon School.

References

External links
 
 
 

School districts in Alaska
Aleutians East Borough, Alaska
1988 establishments in Alaska
School districts established in 1988